The 1947–48 season was Stoke City's 41st season in the Football League and the 27th in the First Division.

After narrowly missing out on their first league title last season there was a huge weight of expectation for the Stoke squad of 1947–48. But great misfortune was the story of the season as six key players suffered long term injuries all in September. The side battled on with inexperienced youngsters having to fill the gaps and relegation was a distinct possibility but they managed to recover and finish in 15th position.

Season review

League
Manager Bob McGrory, ambitious and anxious now to build on last season success, twice broke the club's record transfer in the Summer of 1947 when he brought in forwards Jimmy McAlinden from Portsmouth and Tommy Kiernan from Celtic for fees of £7,000 and £8,500 respectively. These two new players on top of the best from last season looked good for Stoke in the 1947–48 season as not many teams in the country could boast such an exciting young squad as Stoke's.

Unfortunately, an appalling catalogue of injuries soon made it obvious that the fans would see no repeat of the form showed from last season. By mid-September six of Stoke's key players, Jock Kirton, Neil Franklin, Frank Baker, George Mountford, Frank Mountford and Freddie Steele, all suffered major injuries which ruled them out for most of the season. The team battled on though, and in the end took 15th place in the table, having spent quite some time in the bottom three, relegation was a distinct possibility. Only six teams conceded fewer goals than Stoke but it was in attack where the problems lay, Stoke's goal threat completely drying up with Stoke scoring 90 goals last season and just 41 this season. Yet despite the frustrating anti-climax for the Stoke public the average home gate rose again this time to 31,590.

FA Cup
There was no joy in the cup for Stoke fans as a 4–2 victory over Mansfield Town was followed by a 3–0 reverse against Second Division Queens Park Rangers.

Final league table

Results

Stoke's score comes first

Legend

Football League First Division

FA Cup

Squad statistics

References

Stoke City F.C. seasons
Stoke